The Princess Pat Stakes was an American Thoroughbred horse race first run in 1937 at Chicago's Washington Park Race Track. A race for two-year-old fillies, except for 1941 and 1942 when it was open to fillies and mares age three and older, the Princess Pat Stakes was moved to Arlington Park in 1958.

For most of its duration, the Princess Pat Stakes offered the largest purse of an American race for two-year-old fillies. In 1954, it was the world's richest race for 2-year-old fillies with a purse of $102,760.

The Princess Pat Stakes was run in two divisions in 1961.

Records
Speed record:
 1:09.20 - Smart Deb (for 6 furlongs)

Most wins by a jockey:
 3 - Douglas Dodson (1945, 1947, 1949)

Most wins by an owner:
 3 - Calumet Farm (1944, 1947, 1951)

Winners

References

Discontinued horse races
Horse races in Illinois
Flat horse races for two-year-old fillies
Recurring sporting events established in 1937
Recurring sporting events disestablished in 1963
Washington Park Race Track
Arlington Park